Attia Al Nashwy (born 21 March 1988) is an Egyptian footballer who currently plays as a striker for Egyptian club Al Assiouty Sport.

References

1988 births
Living people
Egyptian footballers
Egyptian Premier League players
Association football forwards
Al Masry SC players
Pyramids FC players
21st-century Egyptian people